Federal Highway 110 (Carretera Federal 110) is a Federal Highway of Mexico.

References

110
Transportation in Colima
Transportation in Guanajuato
Transportation in Michoacán